Mary Carolyn Davies (1888–?) was an American writer from Oregon. She was a poet, short story writer, and playwright. She lived for a period in New York, where she was a participant of several writing soirées. She later moved back to Oregon, where she led writing organizations. She again moved back to New York in the 1930s, and after this, she was no longer in the public eye. It is not known when she died, but by 1940, she had been sick for a few years.

Early life 
Davies was born in Sprague, Washington and moved to Portland, Oregon at the age of 12. She graduated high school in 1910, taught for a year, and enrolled at University of California at Berkeley in 1911.

Career
While at Berkeley, Davies won both the Bohemian Club prize and Emily Chamberlin Cook Prize for Poetry. She was the first woman to win the former, and the freshman to win the latter. After a year, she left college and moved to New York. After settling in New York, she was destitute, and resorted to writing stories and poetry to make ends meet and survive. Much of her productive output from this period was described by poet Louis Untermeyer as "hackwork", though he saw genuine art as well.

In New York, she was added to a circle of poets, and was featured among the many soirées (as one participant said) that were held in the club. Participants included Alfred Kreymborg, Marcel Duchamp, and Marianne Moore. In fact, it was Davies who was responsible for bringing Moore to the club; this was described by Kreymborg as Davies being accompanied by "an astonishing person with ... a mellifluous flow of polysyllables which held every man in awe".

Eventually, Davies returned to Portland, and became the president of the state's women's press club in 1920 and of the Northwest Poetry Society in 1924. During the 1920s, her work appeared in several magazines, such as McClure's. Her published books include Drums on our Street: A Book of War Poems (1918), Youth Riding (1919), The Husband Test (1921), and The Skyline Trail: A Book of Western Verse (1924). She also published a play, The Slave with Two Faces (1918), which was staged with actors Dorothy Upjohn, Blanche Hays, Hutchinson Collins, Otto Liveright, Alice Macdougal, and Ida Rauh. It was described by scholar Cheryl Black as in an "abstract or fantastic setting".

In the 1930s, she returned to New York, and fell out of public view. Little of her life is known from or after this period.

Later life and death
In 1940, Davies was reported as sick in a newspaper. Ethel Romig Fuller, a friend of hers and also a poet, indicated she had been sick for at least two years, but it is not clear how she became sick.

While there have been attempts to find evidence of her death, there are no records in Oregon, and an obituary has not been located.

Legacy
The Poetry Society created an award in her name.

References

Citations

Bibliography

 
 
 
 
 
 

1888 births
20th-century American women writers
Poets from Oregon
University of California, Berkeley alumni
Year of death missing